Silvana Jachino (2 February 1916 – 28 August 2004) was an Italian film actress. She appeared in 65 films between 1936 and 1970. She was born in Milan, Italy and died in Rimini, Italy.

Partial filmography

 Cuor di vagabondo (1936)
 Nozze vagabonde (1936)
 Cavalry (1936) - Carlotta di Frasseneto
 Fiordalisi d'oro (1936) - Agnese di Fitz-James
 Bertoldo, Bertoldino e Cacasenno (1937) - Principessa Fiorella
 It Was I! (1937)
 Gatta ci cova (1937) - Iole - la figlia di Antonia
 The Black Corsair (1938) - Honorata
 Ballerine (1938)
 Departure (1938) - Mimì
 Lotte nell'ombra (1938) - Dora
 L'ultimo scugnizzo (1938) - Antonio's girfriend
 Crispino e la comare (1938) - La marchesina
 Lancieri di Savoia (1939)
 Fascino (1939) - Liliana
 Il ladro (1939) - Nelly
 We Were Seven Widows (1939) - Barbara
 L'aria del continente (1939)
 Le educande di Saint-Cyr (1939) - Gemmina Merian
 Diario di una stella (1940)
 The Thrill of the Skies (1940) - Maria
 Boccaccio (1940) - Fiammetta
 Eternal Melodies (1940)
 Saint John, the Beheaded (1940) - Serafina Miciacio
 Non me lo dire! (1940) - Luisella
The King of England Will Not Pay (1941) - Dianora dei Bardi
 Princess Cinderella (1941) - Cenerentola [Cinderella]
 I Live as I Please (1942) - Maria
 C'è un fantasma nel castello (1942) - La baronessina, sua figlia
 L'affare si complica (1942)
 Charley's Aunt (1943) - Rina
 Senza una donna (1943) - Marta
 Lettere al sottotenente (1945) - La ragazza graziosa
 Fire Over the Sea (1947) - Diana La Spina
 L'isola del sogno (1947) - Eva Fuller
 Sono io l'assassino (1948)
 Il corriere di ferro (1948) - Elda
 Fabiola (1949) - Lucilla
 Torna a Napoli (1949)
 I peggiori anni della nostra vita (1949) - Rosetta
 Accidents to the Taxes!! (1951) - Signora Penna
 My Heart Sings (1951) - Cameriera
 Catalina de Inglaterra (1951)
 Sardinian Vendetta (1952) - Guardarobiera
 Five Paupers in an Automobile (1952) - La segretaria del salone auto
 Nero and the Burning of Rome (1953) - Eunike
 Martin Toccaferro (1953)
 Condannata senza colpa (1953) - La madre superiora
 Anna perdonami (1953)
 Mizar (Sabotaggio in mare) (1954)
 The White Angel (1955) - La detenuta bionda
 The Last Five Minutes (1955) - La cameriera
 The Window to Luna Park (1957) - The teacher (uncredited)
 Esterina (1959) - Padrona di casa
 Julius Caesar Against The Pirates (1962) - Quintilia - Valerio's Daughter
 ...e la donna creò l'uomo (1964)
 Juliet of the Spirits (1965) - Dolores
 Password: Kill Agent Gordon (1966)
 Formula 1: Nell'Inferno del Grand Prix (1970) - Giacomo's Mother
 La modification (1970) - Mme De Monte

References

External links

1916 births
2004 deaths
Italian film actresses
20th-century Italian actresses
Actresses from Milan